Uherský Ostroh is a town in Uherské Hradiště District in the Zlín Region of the Czech Republic. It has about 4,200 inhabitants. The historic town centre is well preserved and is protected by law as an urban monument zone.

Administrative parts
Town parts of Kvačice and Ostrožské Předměstí are administrative parts of Uherský Ostroh.

Etymology
The name literally means "Hungarian promontory". It refers to its historic location on a promontory near borders with Kingdom of Hungary.

Geography
The town lies on the Morava river, on its confluence with the small river Okluky. Western part of the municipal territory lies in the Lower Morava Valley, eastern part lies in the Vizovice Highlands.

History

A predecessor of the town was a settlement called Stenice, located on an island of the river Morava. The settlement existed here in the second half of the 11th century. In the mid-13th century, a defense system was built against invasions from Hungary. It included a water fortress near a ford across the Morava, founded here by Ottokar II of Bohemia. The first written mention of the Ostroh Castle is from 1275.

During the Hussite Wars, Uherský Ostroh was a military camp of the Hussites. In 1511, Uherský Ostroh was acquired by the lords of Kunovice. During their rule, the water fortress was rebuilt into a Renaissance residence. After the Battle of White Mountain in 1620, the properties of lords of Kunovice were confiscated from them, and Uherský Ostroh was acquired by the Liechtenstein family, who owned it for almost 300 years.

The Liechtenstein family did not reside here and the estate economically stagnated. Uherský Ostroh suffered from frequent floods and raids by Turks and Hungarians, however it remained a small agricultural and craft town.

Culture
Uherský Ostroh lies in the cultural region of Moravian Slovakia. Annual cultural events in the town include ceremonial opening of the tourist season, theatrical mini-festival, European Heritage Days celebrations, and hody.

Sights

The most important monument is the Uherský Ostroh Castle. It was rebuilt to its present appearance in 1560–1570 and the castle park was added. Today it serves as the town hall, a library, and a tourist information centre. The castle tower, the castle gallery and underground spaces with interactive exhibits are open to the public.

Main landmark of the town square is the Church of Saint Andrew. The church was built in Baroque and Neoclassical styles in 1751–1758. The town square is lined by preserved burgher houses.

In Ostrožské Předměstí is a prismatic bell tower from the 1870s, with decorative sgraffiti by Jano Köhler from 1912.

Notable people
Joel Müller (1827–1895), rabbi
Franz Krones (1835–1902), Austrian historian
Israel Taglicht (1862−1943), rabbi
Jan Černý (1874–1959), politician, prime minister of Czechoslovakia
Otakar Borůvka (1899–1995), mathematician
Martin Lecián (1900–1927), serial killer
František Vaněk (1931–2020), ice hockey player

Twin towns – sister cities

Uherský Ostroh is twinned with:
 Trenčianska Teplá, Slovakia

References

External links

Cities and towns in the Czech Republic
Populated places in Uherské Hradiště District